Censorinus is a tiny lunar impact crater located on a rise to the southeast of the Mare Tranquillitatis. It is named after the ancient Roman writer Censorinus. To the northeast is the crater Maskelyne.

Censorinus is distinguished by an area of high-albedo material surrounding the rim. This makes the feature highly prominent when the Sun is at a high angle, and it is one of the brightest objects on the visible Moon. Bright streaks radiate away radially from the crater, and contrast with the darker lunar mare.

This formation has a sharp-edged, raised rim and a symmetrical, cup-shaped interior. Close-up photographs of this crater by Lunar Orbiter 5 show many large blocks lying along the sloping outer rampart. The surface near the crater is hummocky from the deposited ejecta. The crater is otherwise undistinguished.

The vicinity of Censorinus was once considered for an early Apollo landing site.

Satellite craters
By convention these features are identified on lunar maps by placing the letter on the side of the crater midpoint that is closest to Censorinus.

The following craters have been renamed by the IAU.
 Censorinus F — See Leakey (crater).

References

External links
 Lunar Photo of the Day, "Land of Manna", October 5, 2006, showing Censorinus, and Censorius C, noted as similar to Gaudibert crater

Impact craters on the Moon